William Trowbridge Merrifield Forbes (April 23, 1885 Westborough – April 12, 1968 Worcester) was an American entomologist who specialized in Lepidoptera and Coleoptera.

Works
Partial list

Coleoptera
The wing-venation of the Coleoptera. Annals of the Entomological Society of America 15:328–345, pls.29–35 (1922).
The wing folding patterns of the Coleoptera. Journal of the New York Entomological Society 34:42–68, 91–115, pls.7–18 (1926).

Lepidoptera

The Lepidoptera of New York and Neighboring States: 1. Primitive forms, Microlepidoptera, Pyraloids, Bombyces. Memoir 68. Ithaca, NY: Cornell University Agricultural Experiment Station. 729 p. (1923).
The Lepidoptera of New York and Neighboring States: 2. Geometridae, Sphingidae, Notodontidae, Lymantriidae. Memoir 274. Ithaca, NY: Cornell University Agricultural Experiment Station. 263 p. (1948).
The Lepidoptera of New York and Neighboring States: 3. Noctuidae. Memoir 329. Ithaca, NY: Cornell University Agricultural Experiment Station. 433 p. (1954)
The Lepidoptera of New York and Neighboring States: 4. Agaristidae through Nymphalidae including butterflies. Memoir 371. Ithaca, NY: Cornell University Agricultural Experiment Station. 188 p. (1960)

External links
William L. Brown, Jr. Robert L. Clausen, John G. Franclemont (1968): William Trowbridge Merrifield Forbes, April 23, 1885 – April 12, 1968 at ecommons.library.cornell.edu

American entomologists
1885 births
1968 deaths
20th-century American zoologists